The Rankin–Sherrill House is a historic home located at Mount Ulla, Rowan County, North Carolina.  It was built about 1855, and is a two-story, three bay, "L"-plan brick dwelling with Greek Revival-style design elements. It has a low hipped roof and the front facade has a simple hipped roof Colonial Revival porch.  Also on the property is a contributing Smokehouse/Oairy/Well House built about 1853.

It was listed on the National Register of Historic Places in 1982.

References

Houses on the National Register of Historic Places in North Carolina
Colonial Revival architecture in North Carolina
Greek Revival houses in North Carolina
Houses completed in 1855
Houses in Rowan County, North Carolina
National Register of Historic Places in Rowan County, North Carolina